The Renault Trucks T  is a range of heavy-duty trucks manufactured by Renault Trucks. The truck was presented on 11 June 2013 with a show called R/Evolution and was introduced at the end of 2013, being the first from a new line of vehicles for the company.

Design
The last of the major European manufacturers to introduce a Euro VI compliant vehicle, Renault allowed chief designer Hervé Bertrand to design a vehicle. Although using some common parts from the new Volvo FH series, the design was seen as a step-forward inspiration from the Renault Magnum, with a front grille area was inspired by a conveyor belt and a unique design cab area, designed for long distance international trunk routes.

Characteristics
The Renault Trucks T includes the robotised Optidriver transmission as standard, improved aerodynamics to reduce fuel consumption and new comfort and security features.

Engines
The  T offers two Euro VI six-cylinder engines, the 11 L DTI 11 (with a power output of 380, 430 and 460hp) and the 13 L DTI 13 (440, 480 and 520hp).

Awards
On 23 September 2014, the Renault Trucks T was voted International Truck of the Year 2015 during the International Motor Show Germany in Hanover.

References

Vehicles introduced in 2013
T